Clarion is an American six-week workshop for aspiring science fiction and fantasy writers. Originally an outgrowth of Damon Knight's and Kate Wilhelm's Milford Writers' Conference, held at their home in Milford, Pennsylvania, United States, it was founded in 1968 by Robin Scott Wilson at Clarion State College in Pennsylvania. Knight and Wilhelm were among the first teachers at the workshop.

In 1972, the workshop moved to Michigan State University. It moved again, in 2006, to the University of California, San Diego.

In 2015, the Clarion Foundation received an anonymous gift of $100,000 to create an endowment funding the workshop.

The Clarion workshops for 2020 and 2021 were cancelled due to the COVID-19 pandemic, with the students selected for 2020 slated to attend in 2022.

Other Clarion Workshops 
Independently operated workshops which share the Clarion name and follow its founding principles include:
 Clarion West Writers Workshop, founded in Seattle, Washington in 1971 by Vonda N. McIntyre. It has been held annually since 1984.
 Clarion South Writers Workshop was held at Griffith University in Brisbane, Australia. It was founded in 2004 and ran biennially to 2011. In 2009, Clarion South lost its venue, although the workshop was held that year. In March 2011, Clarion South organizers announced that future workshops were "on hold indefinitely".

See also 
 List of Clarion Writers Workshop Instructors
 List of Clarion Writers Workshop alumni
 List of Clarion South Writers Workshop Instructors

References

Further reading

External links
 Clarion official website
Clarion Science Fiction and Fantasy Workshop: Archive of Stories by Participants MSS 681. Special Collections & Archives, UC San Diego Library.

American writers' organizations
Creative writing programs
Science fiction organizations
1968 establishments in Pennsylvania
Clarion University of Pennsylvania
Michigan State University
University of California, San Diego
Projects established in 1968